is a 1991 video game developed by Santos and published by Sega for the Mega Drive.  It is a golf video game where the player must stop a mad scientist. Upon release the game did not receive good reviews.

Gameplay
The game essentially combines a traditional golf tournament with a plot by a mad professor to take over the world while using that golf tournament as its legitimate front. Yui Mizuhara and Ran Ryuzaki are two normal high school girls who are excellent at golf so they get drafted for this assignment. They are abducted by Professor G, but Yui is liberated before he can brainwash her into his organization.

Players can talk to their opponents before teeing against them in oddly-themed golf courses. Special abilities can be invoked at a certain cost to the attribute that is the equivalent of magic points in standard role-playing games.

Reception

The game was poorly received in Japan and the West, including being given the review scores of 17/40 by Famitsu, 28/50 by ASM.. Joystick gave it 35%.

References

External links
Battle Golfer Yui at MobyGames

1991 video games
Golf video games
Japan-exclusive video games
Science fiction video games
Sega video games
Sega Genesis games
Sega Genesis-only games
Video games featuring female protagonists
Video games developed in Japan